Shungu Dutiro (born 28 January 1999) is a South African footballer.

Club career
Dutiro first showed an interest in football at the age of six, and while studying at the St Stithians College, he signed for Bidvest Wits in 2013. While with Bidvest Wits, he developed into a prolific striker, finishing as top scorer in a number of competitions.

In May 2016, following good performances for the youth sides of Bidvest Wits, he was promoted to the first team. In October of the same year, he was named by English newspaper The Guardian as one of the best players born in 1999 worldwide.

In July 2018, he moved to Mamelodi Sundowns.

References

1999 births
Living people
Alumni of St Stithians College
South African soccer players
Association football forwards
Bidvest Wits F.C. players
Mamelodi Sundowns F.C. players